The play-off first legs were played on 14–16 November 2003, while the second legs were played on 18–19 November 2003. Winners of play-off round qualified to the championship played following year in May and June, where Germany was chosen to host the fixtures.
For the draw of the play-offs, every of the six best runners-up were drawn against one of the six best group winners of another group with the runners-up playing their first match at home. The other group-winners were drawn each other.

Matches

|}

First leg

Second leg

Serbia and Montenegro won 5–4 on aggregate

Germany won 2–1 on aggregate

Croatia won 2–1 on aggregate

3–3 on aggregate, Portugal won 4–1 on penalties.

3–3 on aggregate, Switzerland won 4–3 on penalties.

Belarus won 5–1 on aggregate

1–1 on aggregate, Italy won on away goals rule.

Sweden won 3–1 on aggregate

External links
 Play-offs at UEFA.com

Play-offs
UEFA European Under-21 Championship qualification play-offs